Ludlow is a civil parish in Shropshire, England. It contains over 420 listed buildings that are recorded in the National Heritage List for England. Of these, nine are listed at Grade I, the highest of the three grades, 25 are at Grade II*, the middle grade, and the others are at Grade II, the lowest grade. Most of the listed buildings are grouped around the centre of the town, from a line stretching from Castle Square, along High Street and King Street to Tower Street, and southwards to the River Teme, and to the north along Bull Ring and Corve Street.

The listed buildings reflect the history of the town from the medieval period to the present. The oldest significant buildings are the remains of Ludlow Castle, Broad Gate, a former gateway to the town, St Laurence's Church, and surviving sections of the Town Walls. Most of the listed buildings are houses, cottages, shops, public buildings, hotels and public houses, the earlier ones timber framed, or basically timber framed and later refronted or encased in brick. During the 18th century larger and grander houses were built, most of them in brick. Other listed buildings include weirs, bridges, workshops, almshouses, two gazebos, a well head, two former toll houses, a former paper mill, a hospital, banks, a drinking fountain, and two telephone kiosks.

This list contains the listed buildings in the southern area of the town, south of a line stretching from Castle Square at the west, along Market Street, Street, King Street and Tower Street at the east. The listed buildings in the northern area can be found at Listed buildings in Ludlow (northern area).


Key

Buildings

References

Citations

Sources

Lists of buildings and structures in Shropshire